Rokanuzzaman Khan (known as Dadabhai; 9 April 1925 – 3 December 1999) was a Bangladeshi journalist and litterateur. He was awarded Ekushey Padak in 1998 by the Government of Bangladesh. He was the founder director of children's organization Kochi Kanchar Mela.

Background
Khan's grandfather Mohammad Rawshan Ali Chowdhury was the editor of the monthly magazine Kohinoor. Khan was married to Nurjahan Begum, one of the early female Bangladeshi journalists and the daughter of Mohammad Nasiruddin, founder of Saogat and Begum magazines. His granddaughter Priota Iftekhar made a documentary film on his wife's 91st birth anniversary, titled “Nurjahan Begum – Itihaaser Kingbadanti Nari".

Career
Khan worked at the Daily Ittehad in Kolkata in 1947 and in Shishu Saogat in 1949 and the Millat in 1951. In 1955, he joined The Daily Ittefaq under the pseudonym of Dadabhai and worked until his death in 1999.

Khan formed a children's organization Kochi Kanchar Mela in 1956.

Works
 Hattimatim (1962)
 Khokan Khokan Dak Pari
 Ajob Holeo Gujob Noy

Awards
 Bangla Academy Literary Award (1968)
 Shishu Academy Award (1994)
 Ekushey Padak (1998)
 Jasimuddin Gold Medal
 Rotary International and the Rotary Foundation Trust's Paul Harris Fellow Award
 Independence Day Award (2000)

References

1925 births
1999 deaths
Bangladeshi journalists
Recipients of the Ekushey Padak
Recipients of the Independence Day Award
Recipients of Bangla Academy Award
20th-century journalists